Daniel Fiala (born 24 June 1972) is a Czech former professional tennis player.

Active on tour in the 1990s, Fiala reached career best rankings of 409 in singles and 236 in doubles. He made two ATP Tour doubles main draw appearances at the Czech Indoor tournament in Ostrava and was a four-time doubles finalist on the ATP Challenger Tour. After retiring he became a coach and has coached WTA Tour player Libuše Průšová.

ATP Challenger/ITF Futures finals

Doubles: 7 (3–4)

References

External links
 
 

1972 births
Living people
Czech male tennis players